Mervyn Neagle (7 March 195823 August 2012) was an Australian rules footballer who represented  and  in the Australian Football League (AFL) during the 1970s and 1980s.

Early life
Neagle grew up in Dimboola, a country town in western Victoria. There he formed a lifelong friendship with future teammate Tim Watson. They played junior football and basketball, and they shared a paper round.

Football career

Essendon
Neagle joined , in 1976, preceding Watson who joined the club the following year as a 15-year-old. Both players made their senior debuts in 1977. Neagle finished second in the 1980 Brownlow Medal and equal fifth in 1981.

Neagle was selected to play for Essendon in the 1983 VFL Grand Final. He also played in the 1984 VFL Grand Final, where Essendon won their first premiership in 19 years. Neagle kicked the last goal of the match.

Neagle missed the 1985 premiership.

Sydney Swans
At the end of the season Neagle transferred from Essendon to Sydney, where he played in 1986 until his retirement.

Neagle was offered a rural coaching position in 1989, but chose to remain as a player with Sydney. In all, he played five seasons for Sydney before retiring at the end of the 1990 season.

Post-AFL career
After retiring from AFL football, Neagle played and coached at a number of clubs around Australia, including:
Merbein Football Club
Sale in Victoria
Mount Barker Football Club in the Great Southern Football League
Balranald Football Club in the Central Murray Football League.

In 2009, he coached St Mary's to the Northern Territory Football League premiership.

He also coached North Albury Football Club and Mangoplah-Cookardinia United-Eastlakes, New South Wales in 1997 and 1998, while in 2012 before his death Neagle coached Walla Walla Football Netball Club in the Hume Football League.

Personal life
Neagle worked as a truck driver and was the father of former Essendon player Jay Neagle, who was drafted under the father–son rule at the end of the 2005 AFL season.

Death
Neagle died when the trailer of the B-double truck he was driving flipped over and crushed the cabin at Tharbogang, near Griffith, New South Wales.

Neagle's death at 54 years of age prompted a flow of tributes from former teammates and associates. Coach Kevin Sheedy recalled that Neagle:
...was not only a brilliant footballer but was also a real character. Merv was a very tenacious, hard-running player and his courage and toughness were typical of Essendon teams of that era. He had great physicality for a wingman and was a terrific kick for goal on the run. He also gave a lot back to country football after he retired, and along with Tim Watson was one of the finest players to come out of Dimboola. Merv has left us all too soon but has left those who knew him with many great memories.

References

External links

1958 births
2012 deaths
Australian rules footballers from Victoria (Australia)
Essendon Football Club players
Essendon Football Club Premiership players
Sydney Swans players
Dimboola Football Club players
Sale Football Club players
Sale Football Club coaches
Road incident deaths in New South Wales
One-time VFL/AFL Premiership players